Biju Patnaik University of Technology, also known as BPUT, is located in Rourkela in the state of Odisha, India. There are 110 colleges affiliated to the university. A college may be either a constituent or affiliated type.

The colleges are further classified as government run, private unaided and public private partnership (PPP) or private aided. A government run college is fully supported financially by the Government of Odisha. A private unaided college is funded by the private organisation. A private public partnership (PPP) college is established by state government in collaboration with private bodies, thus is partially funded by the government.

Table legend

Colleges offering B.Tech

Government colleges

Private colleges

Public private partnership colleges

Colleges offering B.Arch

Colleges offering B.Pharm

Colleges offering MCA

Colleges offering MBA

References

Affiliates
Biju Patnaik University of Technology
Biju Patnaik University of Technology